Emil Benecke (4 October 1898 in Magdeburg – 12 August 1945 in Riga, Soviet Union) was a German water polo player who competed in the 1928 Summer Olympics and in the 1932 Summer Olympics.

In 1928 he was part of the German team which won the gold medal. He played all three match and scored three goals.

Four years later he won the silver medal with the German team. He played all four matches.

He died briefly after the end of World War II in Russian war captivity.

See also
 Germany men's Olympic water polo team records and statistics
 List of Olympic champions in men's water polo
 List of Olympic medalists in water polo (men)

References

profile with picture

External links
 

1898 births
1945 deaths
German male water polo players
Water polo players at the 1928 Summer Olympics
Water polo players at the 1932 Summer Olympics
Olympic water polo players of Germany
Olympic gold medalists for Germany
Olympic silver medalists for Germany
Olympic medalists in water polo
German male swimmers
Medalists at the 1932 Summer Olympics
Medalists at the 1928 Summer Olympics
German prisoners of war in World War II held by the Soviet Union
German people who died in Soviet detention
Sportspeople from Magdeburg